Bouddi is a coastal south-eastern suburb of the Central Coast region of New South Wales, Australia. It is in the  local government area. Bouddi is the Aboriginal word for the heart.

The Bouddi area locally refers to the Bouddi Peninsula and the associated suburbs of Killcare, Killcare Heights, Hardys Bay, Pretty Beach, Wagstaffe and Macmasters Beach. All of these suburbs/villages fringe the wonderful Bouddi National Park that includes Maitland Bay.

See also
 Bouddi National Park

Notes

References

Suburbs of the Central Coast (New South Wales)